Phouoibi Shayon, also simply known as Phouoibi, is a 2017 Indian Meitei language mythological film, about goddess Phouoibi and other celestial fairies who came down to earth to prosper the human civilization. The film is directed by O. Samananda, starring Lilabati, Kaiku Rajkumar and Gokul Athokpam, under the collaboration of Kanglei Movies World and Sergey Film Production.

Plot 
Goddess Phouoibi and her divine sisters are ordered by God Koupalu (Koubru) to go down to earth to prosper the human civilization. On the way, she meets Akongjamba in the Moirang kingdom and the two fall in love with each other.

Cast 
 Kaiku Rajkumar
 Lilabati as Phouoibi

See also 

 List of Meitei-language films

References 

2010s Meitei-language films
Epic cycles of incarnations
Meitei folklore in popular culture
Meitei mythology in popular culture
Phouoibi